Pterophorus erratus is a moth of the family Pterophoridae. It is found in Sabah on the island Borneo.

References
 , 2000: On the genus Pterophorus Schäffer, 1766 in Indonesia (Lepidoptera: Pterophoridae). Quadrifina 3: 61-69.

Moths described in 2000
erratus